MakFest founded in 1986, is the largest festival of Macedonian popular music. It is held every year in November, in Štip, Republic of North Macedonia, at the Cultural Center "Aco Šopov". MakFest is a member of FIDOF (International Federation of Festival Organizations) with headquarters in Los Angeles, CA, USA.  In 1997, MakFest was awarded the "Festival of The Year" distinction by FIDOF.

Winners

References

External links
Official website (Macedonian)
MakFest profile page on VBU Music Registry (ВБУ Музички регистар)(Macedonian)
Retrospective for the Makfest 1986 created by VBU Music Registry (ВБУ Музички регистар)(Macedonian) 

1986 establishments in the Socialist Republic of Macedonia
Annual events in North Macedonia
Music festivals established in 1986
Pop music festivals
Rock festivals in North Macedonia
Štip
Autumn events in North Macedonia
Music festivals in Yugoslavia